Príncipe Airport  is an airport on the island of Príncipe, located  north of Santo António, the island's capital. It is the only airport on Príncipe and one of the three airports serving São Tomé and Príncipe. It was built in 1968 during Portuguese colonial rule. The only commercial flights available are to São Tomé International Airport in the capital, but private and charter flights are also available.

East of the airport is the settlement of Aeroporto named after the airport.

Airlines and destinations

Renovations

In 2012, the Portuguese construction firm Mota-Engil was hired to modernize the airport. The main focus was lengthening the runway to allow it to accommodate mid-size jets. Although regional President José Cardoso Cassandra originally announced the work would be completed in 17 months, it was not finished until October 2015. The renovations were funded by a $18 million investment by a South African firm, which also involved the construction of a five-star eco-tourism hotel on the island.

Facilities 
It has 1 runway designated 18/36 with an asphalt surface. Unlike the airport in São Tomé, the airport in Príncipe is not certified for Instrument Flight Rules. The airport does have customs facilities, but there are no commercial international flights into Príncipe, so the facilities are only for passengers arriving on charter and private flights.

References

External links

 

Airports in São Tomé and Príncipe
Príncipe